The Battle of La Higueruela was fought in the vega of the river Genil near Granada on 1 July 1431 between the forces of John II of Castile, led by Álvaro de Luna, and troops loyal to Muhammed IX, Nasrid Sultan of Granada. The battle was a modest victory for the forces of Castile, with no territorial gain and failing to take Granada.  Following this battle, John II of Castile installed Yusuf IV, grandson of Muhammed VI, as Sultan of Granada.

The battle is depicted in a famous series of fresco paintings by Fabrizio Castello, Orazio Cambiasi and Lazzaro Tavarone in the Gallery of Battles at the Royal Monastery of San Lorenzo de El Escorial.

See also
 List of Castilian monarchs
 Nasrid dynasty

Footnotes

Bibliography
 
 
 

La Higueruela
Higueruela
La Higueruela
Higueruela
Conflicts in 1431
1431 in Europe
15th century in Al-Andalus
15th century in Castile